Elisabeth Owens (May 15, 1919 – November 15, 1998) was an American legal scholar. In 1972 she was the first woman to be granted tenure at Harvard Law School.

References

1919 births
1998 deaths
American legal scholars
Harvard Law School faculty
American women legal scholars